The  is a railway line operated by the Japanese private railway company Kintetsu Railway, connecting Ujiyamada Station in Ise, Mie with Toba Station in Toba, Mie. The line runs parallel to JR Central's Sangū Line.

The line connects with the Yamada Line at Ujiyamada Station and the Shima Line at Toba Station.  The Yamada Line, Toba Line, and Shima Line form a single train line that begins at Ise-Nakagawa Station and serves the Ise-Shima tourist region.

Service outline
 LO  Local
 For 
 For , 
(Locals stop at every station.)

 EX  Express
 For ; via  and 
 For 
(Expresses typically end at Ujiyamada and Isuzugawa, occasionally run all the way to Toba.)

 RE  Rapid Express
 For 
(Only runs mornings and evenings.)
(Rapid expresses typically end at Ujiyamada and Isuzugawa, occasionally run all the way to Toba.)

 LE  Limited Express
 For ; via  (Nara)
 For ; via  and 
 For , 
(Seat reservations and limited express fee required.)

 NS  Non-stop Limited Express
 For 
 For 
 For 
(Runs twice a day on weekends.)
(Seat reservations and limited express fee required.)
 SV  Premium Express Shimakaze
 For 
 For 
 For 
 For 
(Train to and from Osaka runs once a day except on Tuesday with some exceptions.)
(Train to and from Kyoto runs once a day except on Wednesday with some exceptions.)
(Train to and from Nagoya runs once a day except on Thursday with some exceptions.)
(Seat reservations, limited express fee and "Shimakaze" special vehicle fee required.)

Stations

History
The decision to build the line was based on Kintetsu wanting to attract visitors from among the many people attending the 1970 World's Fair in Osaka to the Ise-Shima region where Kintetsu runs a variety of tourism business enterprises, and direct rail service would largely improve the bus system that was in place at that time, thereby making it more convenient to travel there.

The final link
Originally, what are now the Osaka Line and the Yamada Line were completed in the late 1920s / early 1930s by two separate companies, but both lines came under the control of Kintetsu in the 1940s. This made possible direct rail service from Osaka to Ise (at that time called Ujiyamada), primarily used by tourists and pilgrims going to Ise Grand Shrine. Also completed in the late 1920s was what is now the Shima Line which runs from Toba to Kashikojima.  This line was built by a third independent railway company and went through the ownership of various companies over the years, finally falling under the umbrella of Kintetsu in 1965.

Kintetsu now owned train lines that stretched from both Osaka and Nagoya as far as Ise (Ujiyamada Station) as well as a small disconnected line running between Toba and Shima (Kashikojima Station), however there was no Kintetsu rail link between Ise and Toba, meaning Kintetsu passengers bound for Shima had to switch from train to a bus (or a train run by Kintetsu’s main competitor, JNR) in Ise, then back to another Kintetsu train in Toba to complete the journey. The first solution, implemented in the 1960s, was building a bus ramp right up to the train platform of Ujiyamada Station and running buses that were timed to match up with the arriving limited expresses from Osaka and Nagoya, allowing passengers on those trains to easily switch to the bus without leaving the station or waiting long. However, in preparation for the 1970 World's Fair, Kintetsu decided it was a good time to implement the ideal solution which was direct rail access all the way to Kashikojima; thus the Toba Line was built to provide the final link.

Construction commenced in 1968 and a single track, connecting the Yamada Line and the Shima Line, was completed in 1970 just two weeks before the World's Fair began. Trains on this single-track Toba Line waited for each other to pass at a signal station located between Asama Station and Ikenoura Station near the line's midpoint. The line was officially completed when a second track was finished in 1975, thereby allowing bi-directional travel at all times.

Timeline
May 1, 1968 - Construction begins.
December 15, 1969 - First track opens on Ujiyamada ~ Isuzugawa section.
March 1, 1970 - First track opens on Isuzugawa ~ Toba section.  Direct service from both Osaka and Nagoya to Kashikojima begins.
December 25, 1971 - Second track opens on Ujiyamada ~ Isuzugawa section.
April 11, 1975 - Second track opens on Isuzugawa ~ Asama section.
December 20, 1975 - Second track opens on Asama ~ Toba section.  Bi-directional service begins; Shigō Signal Station is closed.
May 30, 2001: Wanman driver-only train service begins.

References

External links
 Kintetsu railway network map - Osaka Line 　 Yamada Line 　 Toba Line 　 Shima Line
 Japan Guide - Shima Peninsula Travel - Toba Aquarium
 Japan Guide - Shima Peninsula Travel - Mikimoto Pearl Island

Toba Line
Rail transport in Mie Prefecture
Standard gauge railways in Japan
Railway lines opened in 1970